François Jacolin, M.D.P., (born 25 April 1950) is a French Roman Catholic Prelate who currently serves as the Bishop of Diocese of Luçon.

Early life 
François Jacolin was born in the town of Fontainebleau, France on 25 April 1950.

Catholic vocation 
On 4 April 1982, François Jacolin was ordained to the priesthood, serving in the Roman Catholic Diocese of Bourges, France. Two years later, on 4 April 1984, Jacolin took vows in the 'l’Institut religieux des Missionnaires de la Plaine et de Sainte-Thérèse', and took his perpetual vows to the Order in 1987.

On 16 January 2007, Jacolin became the Bishop-Elect of the Diocese of Mende, and he received his episcopal consecration from Archbishop Guy Marie Alexandre Thomazeau on 18 March 2007.

Sources 

Living people

1950 births

Bishops of Luçon

French Roman Catholic bishops
21st-century French Roman Catholic bishops